The Arwa Group is a set of three Himalayan peaks, named Arwa Tower, Arwa Crest, and Arwa Spire, situated in the Chamoli district of Uttarakhand state, in northern India. They are situated on the south side of the southwest branch of the Arwa Valley, south of the dry lake Arwa Tal, and northwest of Badrinath. To their south lies the Bhagirath Kharak Glacier. Lying near the border with Tibet, these peaks have restricted access, and they have not been frequented by climbers until recently. However their steep, rocky profiles offer an extreme challenge to high-level rock climbers.

The three peaks lie close together and share a base camp. Reaching the base camp in the Arwa Valley, at an elevation of 4,350 m (14,270 ft), requires a three-day trek from Badrinath. All these peaks are on the Arwa-Bagneu divide and can also be approached from the south.

Arwa Tower

The Arwa Tower is a peak with a huge rocky ridge along with a steep granite wall. The summit is a needle-like tower on the east ridge. The massif is flanked by many steep buttresses. The First ascent of the Tower was made by Britons Mick Fowler and Steve Sustad on 14 May 1999, via the northwest face. In May 2002, a French expedition led by Antoine de Choudens (with 11 members) climbed Arwa Tower by two different routes: a first ascent of the south face, and a new route on the northwest face. On 9 June 2007 Stephan Siegrist, Thomas Senf and Denis Burdet succeeded to climb the previously thought impossible to climb over-hanging north face route for the first time.

Routes
North West Face.
South Face - French Route
North West Buttress - Pilier Guilhem Chaffiol
North Face/East Ridge
South Face - French route

Arwa Spires

The Arwa Spires are a series of stupendous rocky spires which offer highly challenging rock climbs. The spires have two main peaks, namely the main (or east) and west peaks. (However, there is some doubt about which peak is higher.) They are situated southwest of Arwa Tower. The first ascent of the east spire (to the base of a small summit pinnacle) was made in October 2000 by a British expedition led by Kenton Cool, via the east ridge. Andy Benson and Pete Benson made the first summit climb, followed five days later by Cool, Ian Parnell, and Al Powell.

Routes
North East Ridge
North Face, Right Hand Couloir
North East Ridge
North Face - Fior di Vite
East Ridge - English route
Capisco to West Summit

Arwa Crest

Arwa Crest is the crest-like peak in the Arwa area. It is situated to the west of the Arwa Tower. The easiest route is via the north face. The first ascent was made, using this route, in 2002 by a French team including Philippe Renard, Grégory Muffat Joly, Laurent Miston, and Antoine de Choudens.

Routes
North Face - French route
East Ridge

Nearby peaks
Kamet
Nilkantha
Chaukamba

Nearby glaciers
 Bhagirath Kharak Glacier
 Arwa Glacier

See also
 List of Himalayan peaks of Uttarakhand

References

Tourist attractions in Uttarakhand
Geography of Chamoli district
Mountains of Uttarakhand